Carlos Ortega Pérez (born 15 December 1989 in Huauchinango, Puebla) is a Mexican former footballer who last played for Venados F.C.

References

External links
 

Living people
1989 births
Association football midfielders
Albinegros de Orizaba footballers
Lobos BUAP footballers
Ballenas Galeana Morelos footballers
Ascenso MX players
Liga Premier de México players
Footballers from Puebla
People from Huauchinango
Mexican footballers